Himatangi is a small settlement in the Manawatū-Whanganui region of New Zealand's North Island. It is located at the junction of State Highways 1 and 56, 25 kilometres west of Palmerston North, and seven kilometres east of the coastal settlement of Himatangi Beach.

The area has two marae:
 Motuiti Marae and its Rakau or Paewai meeting house is affiliated with the Rangitāne hapū of Ngāti Mairehau and the Ngāti Raukawa hapū of Ngāti Rākau.
 Paranui Marae and its Turanga meeting house is affiliated with the Ngāti Raukawa hapū of Ngāti Te Au and Ngāti Tūranga.

About 50 Māori land blocks are located between Himatangi and Foxton to the south.

History

The area was largely undeveloped with rough terrain in 1942, according to a photograph held in the National Library of New Zealand.

Himatangi was once the location of the junction between the New Zealand Railways Department's Foxton Branch railway and the Manawatu County Council's Sanson Tramway. Both lines are now closed; use of the Tramway ceased in 1945, followed by the Branch in 1959.

In 2005, a study found agricultural pesticides were being rapidly leached into the sandy soil at Himatangi.

In 2009, planning approval was granted for the building of a piggery after the landowner agreed to reduce from what he originally proposed.

In 2014, the community was used as a trial community for the Horizons Regional Council's emergency readiness plan. The landowner and New Zealand Pork Board had been considering legal action through the Environment Court.

In 2019 a regional bus service between Levin and Palmerston North was introduced, providing a weekly return service between Himatangi and Foxton.

Demographics

It had a population of 1,254 at the 2018 New Zealand census, an increase of 210 people (20.1%) since the 2013 census, and an increase of 87 people (7.5%) since the 2006 census. There were 540 households. There were 642 males and 612 females, giving a sex ratio of 1.05 males per female. The median age was 48 years (compared with 37.4 years nationally), with 207 people (16.5%) aged under 15 years, 192 (15.3%) aged 15 to 29, 606 (48.3%) aged 30 to 64, and 249 (19.9%) aged 65 or older.

Ethnicities were 88.8% European/Pākehā, 16.0% Māori, 1.9% Pacific peoples, 2.9% Asian, and 2.2% other ethnicities (totals add to more than 100% since people could identify with multiple ethnicities).

The proportion of people born overseas was 10.0%, compared with 27.1% nationally.

Although some people objected to giving their religion, 57.7% had no religion, 26.8% were Christian, 0.2% were Hindu and 3.6% had other religions.

Of those at least 15 years old, 120 (11.5%) people had a bachelor or higher degree, and 327 (31.2%) people had no formal qualifications. The median income was $26,700, compared with $31,800 nationally. The employment status of those at least 15 was that 477 (45.6%) people were employed full-time, 147 (14.0%) were part-time, and 42 (4.0%) were unemployed.

Education

References

Manawatu District
Populated places in Manawatū-Whanganui